Charles Henry Ridding (26 November 1825 – 13 March 1905) was an English cricketer. He was a right-handed batsman who occasionally played as a wicketkeeper.

Ridding was educated at Winchester College, where he represented the college cricket team, and at Trinity College, Oxford, where he matriculated in 1841, later moving to Magdalen College.

Ridding made his first-class debut for Oxford University against the Marylebone Cricket Club in 1845. From 1845 to 1849 he represented the university twelve times, with his final first-class appearance for the university coming against Cambridge University in 1849. In his twelve first-class matches he scored 248 runs at a batting average of 13.77, with a highest score of 33.

In 1848 Ridding represented Oxford and Cambridge Universities in a single first-class match against the Gentlemen of England. In the same year he represented Gentlemen in the Gentlemen v Players fixture.

In 1849 Ridding played for the Gentlemen of England in a first-class match against the Gentlemen of Kent. In the same season he played for England in a match against Kent. From 1949 to 1853 he played in numerous fixtures for the Gentlemen.

From 1848 to 1855, Ridding represented the All-England Eleven in non-first-class fixtures and during the same period played against them for teams such as Oxfordshire, Sussex and Hampshire. He also played numerous non-first-class fixtures for the Gentlemen of Hampshire from 1857 to 1864.

In 1859 Ridding represented Wiltshire and Monmouthshire in fixtures against All England Eleven.

In 1861 Ridding made a single first-class appearance for Hampshire against the Marylebone Cricket Club. Ridding made his debut for Hampshire County Cricket Club in 1864 against Sussex, which was the county club's first match with first-class status. His final first-class match for the county club came against the same opposition later in 1864.

Ridding's final match for Hampshire came in 1865, in a non-first-class fixture against Buckinghamshire.

In his first-class career Ridding played 29 matches, scoring 492 runs at a batting average of 11.71, with a highest score of 33. Ridding also took a single first-class wicket, although the number of balls he bowled and runs he conceded are unknown, thus his average cannot be calculated.

Ridding died at Funtley, Hampshire on 13 March 1905.

References

External links
 Charles Ridding] at Cricinfo
Charles Ridding at CricketArchive
Matches and detailed statistics for Charles Ridding

1825 births
1905 deaths
Cricketers from Winchester
People educated at Winchester College
Alumni of Trinity College, Oxford
English cricketers
Oxford University cricketers
Hampshire cricketers
Gentlemen cricketers
English cricketers of 1826 to 1863
Marylebone Cricket Club cricketers
Gentlemen of the South cricketers
Gentlemen of England cricketers
Oxford and Cambridge Universities cricketers